Clayton S. Rose is an American academic administrator serving as the 15th president of Bowdoin College in Brunswick, Maine.

Early life and education 
Originally from San Rafael, California, Rose graduated from the University of Chicago as an undergraduate in 1980 and with a Master of Business Administration in 1981. In 2003, following a 20-year leadership and management career in finance, he enrolled in the doctoral program in sociology at the University of Pennsylvania to study issues of race in America, earning his master's degree in 2005 and his PhD with distinction in 2007.

Career 
Rose worked as a professor at Harvard Business School from 2007 until his appointment at Bowdoin. Rose officially succeeded Barry Mills as president of Bowdoin on July 1, 2015.

References

External links
Bowdoin College Office of the President

University of Chicago alumni
University of Pennsylvania alumni
Presidents of Bowdoin College
People from San Rafael, California
Living people
University of Chicago Booth School of Business alumni
Year of birth missing (living people)